Ini Ikpe  is a Nigerian actress. She began her film career in 2003, and has acted over 100 movies since that time. In 2012, she was awarded best supporting actress for the movie Kokomma. Kokomma received three nominations at the 9th Africa Movie Academy Awards, with Effah winning the award for Most Promising Actor for her comic role in the film.  It was released on DVD in September 2012.

Early life and education 
Ini Ikpe is an Ibibio from Akwa Ibom state in the south-south part of Nigeria, not far from Calabar. Her mother was a teacher, and her father an Elder In Church. She had a strict upbringing, the fourth of six children, four girls, two boys.  She attended Cornelius Connely College in Calabar for her secondary school alongside Ini Edo. Which she got into acting through her friend Ini Edo and Emem Isong.

Career 
Her acting career started in 2004 with her debut in Yahoo Millionaire. She was discovered by a producer at the audition she attended. although her late father always tell her not to act but when someone have a passion for something you can't stop it.

Films
 Yahoo Millionaire
 The Greatest Sacrifice
 Kokomma
 I'll Take My Chances

References

External links
 Ini Ikpe IMDb
 Pulsenaija.com.ng

Living people
Year of birth missing (living people)
Nigerian film actresses
21st-century Nigerian actresses
Ibibio people
Actresses from Akwa Ibom State
People from Akwa Ibom State